Alfold Football Club is a football club based in Alfold, Surrey, England.

History
The club was established in 1920 as Loxwood and Alfold and joined the Rudgwick & District League. The club split in 1928 and Alfold joined the Cranleigh & District league, before becoming members of the Horsham & District League. They won the league title, the League Cup and the District Cup in 1953–54. When the league folded in the late 1960s, the club transferred to the West Sussex League. They won the Tony Kopp Cup in 1970–71 and were Division Two North champions 1980–81 and 1993–94, also winning the Surrey County Lower Junior Cup in 1988. The club won the Premier Division title in 2002–03 and the Chichester Charity Cup in 2010–11.

Alfold were Division Two runners-up in 2012–13, earning promotion to Division One. In 2015 they moved up to Division Two of the Southern Combination. A fourth-place finish in 2017–18 was enough to earn promotion to Division One. The following season saw the club win the Division One title, resulting in promotion to the Premier Division.

Ground
The club play at the Recreation Ground in Dunsfold Road, Alfold. A new 50-seat stand and floodlights were installed in 2018.

Honours
Southern Combination
Division One champions 2018–19
West Sussex League League
Premier Division champions 2002–03
Division Two North champions 1980–81, 1993–94
Tony Kopp Cup winners 1970–71
Chichester Charity Cup winners 2010–11
Horsham & District League
Champions 1953–54
League Cup winners 1953–54
District Cup winners 1953–54

Records
FA Cup: Preliminary round, 2020–21
FA Vase: Second qualifying round 2020–21

See also
Alfold F.C. players

References

External links
Official website

Association football clubs established in 1920
1920 establishments in England
Football clubs in England
Football clubs in Surrey
West Sussex Football League
Southern Combination Football League